The first season of The Four: Battle for Stardom premiered on Fox on January 4, 2018. Fergie hosted the show, while Sean Combs, DJ Khaled, Meghan Trainor and Charlie Walk were judges. Prior to the season finale, Walk withdrew from the show following sexual assault allegations against him.

On February 8, 2018, the winner was announced as 20-year-old Evvie McKinney from Memphis, Tennessee, who was signed to Republic Records and named iHeartRadio's "On the Verge" artist.

The Four

Key:
 – Challenger against "The Four" won and secured a seat as a new member.
 – Member of "The Four" did not perform.
 – Member of "The Four" won the challenge and secured their seat.
 – Member of "The Four" lost the challenge and was eliminated.
 – Challenger lost their challenge, and was originally eliminated, but received a second chance via #TheFourComeback.
 – Comeback Artist lost their opportunity to challenge one of "The Four" when another comeback artist defeated them.
 – Not in the competition.
 – Final member of “The Four”
* – Original member of "The Four"

 On January 29, a few days before episode 5, it was announced that via The hashtag #TheFourComeback, Zhavia, Ash Minor, Candice Boyd, and Saeed Renaud  received the most tweets and retweets, and would get another opportunity to earn a seat. During Part 1, they were officially brought back onto the show

Challenge Episodes
Key:
 – Artist secured a spot and has remained in "The Four".
 – Artist won their challenge, but was eventually eliminated from the competition.
 – Artist was eliminated from the competition.
 – Artist lost their challenge, and was originally eliminated, but received a second chance via #TheFourComeback.

Week 1 (January 4)
Group performance: "Can't Stop the Feeling!"

Week 2 (January 11) 
Group performance: "Free Your Mind"

Week 3 (January 18)
Note: This is the first time that all four members have been challenged.
Group performance: "Bang Bang"

Week 4 (January 25)
Group performance: "Finesse"

Week 5 (February 1)
This week featured two distinct parts. The first part was the same format as the previous weeks. However, in the second part, four previously eliminated artists received an opportunity to earn a chance to challenge a member of "The Four" another time.
Group performance: "I Gotta Feeling" (With Fergie)

Part 1: New Artist Challenges

Part 2: Comeback Artist Performances
Throughout the run of the season, viewers voted for their favorite eliminated members of "The Four" on Twitter using the hashtag #TheFourComeback and another hastag with the artist's first name. On January 29, FOX posted a video on the show's YouTube channel, which announced that Ash Minor, Candice Boyd, Saeed Renaud, and Zhavia had been the top four vote-getters and would be returning to the competition.

In Part 2, the four comeback artists were put into two pairs. Each pair had to battle for the judges' unanimous vote to move on. Once the judges picked which of the two comeback artists would move on, each winner challenged one of the remaining members of "The Four."

Finale

Week 6 (February 8)
Group performance: "The Edge of Glory"

Part 1: Head-to-Head Battles
In Part 1, the finalists each performed two songs. For the first song, each finalist performed in hopes of winning over the audience. After performing, the audience voted on their favorite performance, and the finalist with the most votes earned the power to choose who they wanted to battle against in the head-to-head challenge. For their second song, each selected pair went head-to-head. The judges picked a winner from each pair to move on to the final battle.

Part 2: The Final Battle
For the final battle, the two finalists performed once more for the votes of the judges. The winner of this battle would be crowned the winner of The Four.

Artists who appeared on previous shows
Jason Warrior was on the eleventh season of The Voice and reached the live playoffs, but was eliminated.
Ash Minor from Brisbane, Australia, made the top 12 on X Factor Australia in 2012 under his real name (Adil Memon).
Elanese Lansen was a contestant on the U.S. version of The X Factor in 2013.  There is no footage of her performances, but there is an interview package on YouTube entitled "Yes, I Made It!"
Blair Perkins previously auditioned for the twelfth season of American Idol and made it to Hollywood Week.

Famous Relations
Evvie McKinney is the younger sister of singer Gedeon McKinney, who finished in the top 16 of the fifth season of American Idol.
Cheyenne Elliott is the granddaughter of singer Dionne Warwick who later competed on The Masked Singer as the Mouse being eliminated in the second round.

Ratings

References

2018 American television seasons